Rock River may refer to:

Memes
United States
 Rock River (Mississippi River), a tributary of the Mississippi River in Wisconsin and Illinois
 Rock River (Iowa), a tributary of the Big Sioux River in Minnesota and Iowa
 Romemer five geon River), a tributary of the Sturgeon River in Michigan
 Rock River (Lake Champlain), a tributary of Lake Champlain in northern Vermont
 Rock River (West River), a tributary of the West River in southern Vermont
 Little Rock River, in Minnesota and Iowa in the United States

Canada
 Rock River (Yukon), a tributary of the Bell River; see List of rivers of Yukon

Communities
 Rock River, Michigan, in Onota Township, Michigan, USA
 Rock River Township, Michigan, USA
 Rock River, Wyoming, USA
Rock River, a community in Clarendon, Jamaica

Other uses
 Rock River Arms, an American firearms company 
 Rock River Generating Station, Wisconsin, USA
 Rock River Hotel, Illinois, USA
 Rock River Music, music branding agency in San Francisco, CA and Putney, VT
 Rock River Raptors, professional indoor football team in Rockford, Illinois, USA
 Rock River Seminary, original name of Mount Morris College in Mount Morris, Illinois, USA